Laurence Tubiana (born 1951) is a French economist, academic and diplomat. She served as France's Climate Change Ambassador and Special Representative for the 2015 COP21 Climate Change Conference in Paris, and is recognised as a key architect of the resulting Paris Agreement.

Tubiana founded and has headed the Paris-based Institute of Sustainable Development and International Relations (IDDRI), is a professor at Sciences Po Paris, and has previously served as senior adviser on the environment to the former French Prime Minister Lionel Jospin. She has been responsible for conducting international environmental negotiations for the French government and has also been a member of the Economic Analysis Council (Conseil d’analyse économique) attached to the French Prime Minister's office. Since 2013 she has been Chair of the Board of Directors of the French Development Agency (AFD). Since 2017, she has been CEO of the European Climate Foundation.

Early life and education
Tubiana was born in Oran, Algeria, in 1951. Her father, an entrepreneur with interests in tobacco and the cinema, came from an established Jewish Algerian family. Her mother and grandmother were Greek Catholic immigrants and early importers of modern Swedish furniture in Algeria. Thanks to her parents, both French-speaking, left-wing intellectuals, she developed an interest in politics and open discussion from an early age.

Tubiana was 11 when Algeria gained independence in 1962. Together with her family, she moved to France. In May 1968, like many teenagers of the times, she joined the Revolutionary Communist League.

Tubiana graduated from Sciences Po in 1973 and obtained a doctorate in economics from Université Paris I (Sorbonne) in 1976. She then set about taking the entrance examination for INRA, the French National Agricultural Research Institute.

Career

1980s-1990s 
Tubiana worked as an assistant to the then economics professor Lionel Jospin, at the University Technology Institute in Sceaux.

In the 1980s, she founded and headed Solagral, an NGO involved in issues of north–south cooperation, food and agriculture.

In 1997, when Jospin became prime minister, she was his environmental advisor. She helped him with the negotiations for the Kyoto Protocol in 1997. She was also a member of the French Economic Analysis Council (Conseil d’analyse économique) attached to the French Prime Minister's office. In 2000; she was appointed Inspector General of Agriculture in 2000.

Tubiana was also Research Director at INRA (1995-2002) and an associate professor at the École nationale supérieure agronomique in Montpellier (1992-1997).

2000s 
In 2001, Tubiana founded the Institute for Sustainable Development and International Relations (Institut du développement durable et des relations internationales – IDDRI) and in 2003 was appointed Professor and Director of the Sustainable Development Chair at Sciences Po. She was also a visiting professor at Columbia University's School of International and Public Affairs (2004-2014).

Tubiana assisted the French authorities with preparations for the 2009 COP15 climate change conference in Copenhagen.

In May 2009, she created and then led Directorate for Global Public Goods at the French Ministry of Foreign Affairs.

2010s 
Ahead of the 2012 French presidential election, Tubiana co-signed an appeal of several economists in support of candidate François Hollande.

In 2012, Tubiana became a member of France's high-level steering committee on the Energy Transition Debate whose work led to the adoption the French Energy Transition Law in 2015. From 2012 to 2014, she co-chaired the Leadership Council of the Sustainable Development Solutions Network and co-chaired the network's working group on Deep Decarbonization Pathways. She has also been a member of the China Council for International Cooperation on Environment and Development since 2002.

In 2014, Tubiana was appointed France's Climate Change Ambassador and Special Representative for the 2015 COP21 Climate Change Conference in Paris. She is viewed as a key architect of the Paris Agreement on climate change, adopted by the parties to the United Nations Framework Convention on Climate Change (UNFCCC) on 12 December 2015. [See section on the Paris Agreement below.] In 2016, Tubiana was appointed High-Level Champion for pre-2020 climate action to sustain the momentum generated by the Paris Agreement, alongside Hakima El Haité.

Current functions 
Tubiana has been CEO of the European Climate Foundation since 2017. She was appointed a member of France's High Council on Climate Change in 2018. She is Chair of Expertise France's Board and President of the French Environment & Energy Management Agency's (ADEME) Scientific Council. She has also been Chair of the Board of Directors of the French Development Agency (AFD) since 2013.

COP21 and the Paris Agreement

On 15 May 2014, in view of her extensive international expertise on climate issues, Laurent Fabius, French Minister of Foreign Affairs, invited Tubiana to be his representative for the COP21 Paris climate conference. As she explained in a Women of 2015 interview with the Financial Times, Tubiana was then in New York, working as a visiting professor at Columbia University. Despite the enormous amount of work the position of special ambassador would entail, she immediately accepted the offer. Her appointment as Special Ambassador was confirmed at the meeting of the Council of Ministers on 3 June 2014.  Over the next 18 months, she worked days from 7 am to almost midnight and took around 45 trips to meet ministers and business groups around the world. Her strategy, which proved successful, was based on encouraging countries to come up with their own plans for adopting domestic policies to provide for action on climate change.

Before the conference, Tubiana explained her views on global warming: "It's a fascinatingly complex topic... Conditions today are unsustainable and unbalanced, favouring attitudes and levels of consumption which are harmful for us all. The driving force for me is the very idea of justice".

It was Tubiana who suggested inviting the heads of state to the opening of the conference, avoiding the problems faced at COP15 in Copenhagen when they came in at the end. With responsibilities for meals and lighting, she also relaxed the dress code, creating a convivial atmosphere for the delegates. She herself negotiated the corridors of the conference site in sneakers rather than high heels after a horse-riding accident. She had also spent two days in hospital with appendicitis just a week before the conference started. Tubiana was given much of the credit for managing the negotiations, which resulted in the agreement of 195 countries to a final text which went far beyond earlier expectations.

A few days after the conference, Tubiana emphasised its most important outcomes, several of which went significantly beyond the initial goals. They included limiting warming "to well below 2°C and pursuing efforts to limit the temperature increase to 1.5°C" rather than to 2 °C before the meeting. Just a few countries covering only 15% of greenhouse gas emissions were initially required to come up with concrete policies.  After the meeting, all but the poorest countries were included. Financial institutions were also increasingly required to take account of climate change in their investments. As a result of the meeting, new energy technologies would enjoy unexpected levels of development, with ever more joint ventures between national administrations and private companies.

Recognition
 2008 – Officer of the Legion of Honour.

Selected publications
Henry, C., & Tubiana, L. (2017). Earth at Risk: Natural Capital and the Quest for Sustainability. Columbia University Press. .

References

External links

Laurence Tubiana's page at European Climate Foundation

1951 births
Living people
French economists
French women scientists
French environmentalists
Ambassadors of France
People from Oran
Officiers of the Légion d'honneur
French women ambassadors